Alabama's 10th congressional district is an obsolete district which existed from 1917 until 1933.  Its sole representative was William B. Bankhead. (Alabama had a 10th U.S. Representative from 1913 to 1917, but that seat was elected at large.)

Historic boundaries

List of members representing the district

References

Population data from U.S. Census Bureau: Population of Counties by Decennial Census: 1900 to 1990
Additional population data and counties from the Official Congressional Directories of the 63rd Congress (1913); 65th Congress (1919); and 67th Congress (1922)

 Congressional Biographical Directory of the United States 1774–present

10
Former congressional districts of the United States
1917 establishments in Alabama
1933 disestablishments in Alabama
Constituencies established in 1917
Constituencies disestablished in 1933